The Bergdoll Mansion is a historic house located in the Spring Garden neighborhood of Philadelphia.  It was designed by architect James H. Windrim and built in 1886.  It is in a Beaux Arts / Italianate-style.

It was added to the National Register of Historic Places in 1976.

History and architecture
The building was constructed as the home of the Louis Bergdoll family owners of the City Park Brewery. Grover Cleveland Bergdoll, scion of the well known brewing family, was a playboy, aviator, and World War I draft dodger.

The 14,000 square foot mansion has eight bedrooms, nine bathrooms, two kitchens, mahogany woodwork, multiple fireplaces, frescoes and mosaics. It was listed for sale in 2012 with an asking price of $6.9 million.

References

External links
Historical American Buildings Survey, 4 photos

Houses on the National Register of Historic Places in Philadelphia
Beaux-Arts architecture in Pennsylvania
Italianate architecture in Pennsylvania
Houses completed in 1886
Spring Garden, Philadelphia